The Hon.  Charlotte Bingham (born 29 June 1942) is an English novelist who has written over 30 mainly historical romance novels and has also written for many television programmes including Upstairs, Downstairs; Play for Today; and Robin's Nest. In her television work, she often worked with her husband, Terence Brady.

Biography

Early life
The Honourable Charlotte Mary Thérèse Bingham was born on 29 June 1942 in Haywards Heath, Sussex. Her father, John Bingham, 7th Baron Clanmorris, wrote detective stories and was a secret member of MI5. Her mother, Madeleine Bingham, née Madeleine Mary Ebel, was a playwright and biographer. Bingham first attended a school in London, but from the age of seven to 16, she went to the Priory of Our Lady's Good Counsel school in Haywards Heath. After she left school, Bingham went to stay in Paris with some French aristocrats with the intention of learning French. She had written since she was 10 years old and her first piece of work was a thriller called Death's Ticket. Bingham wrote her humorous autobiography, called Coronet Among the Weeds, when she was 19, and not long before her twentieth birthday a literary agent discovered her celebrating at the Ritz. He was a friend of her parents and he took off the finished manuscript of her autobiography. In 1963, this was published by Heinemann and was a best seller.

TV work
In 1966, Charlotte Bingham's first novel, Lucinda, was published. This was later adapted into a TV screenplay. Coronet Among the Grass, her second autobiography (1972), dealt with the first ten years of her marriage to fellow writer Terence Brady. The couple, who have two children, later adapted Coronet Among the Grass and Coronet Among the Weeds, into the TV sitcom No, Honestly. Bingham and her husband collaborated on the scripts for three early episodes of Upstairs, Downstairs, "Board Wages", "I Dies from Love" and "Out of the Everywhere". They later wrote an accompanying book called Rose's Story. They also wrote the episodes of Take Three Girls featuring Victoria (Liza Goddard). In the 1970s, Brady and Bingham wrote episodes for the TV series Play for Today, Three Comedies of Marriage, Yes, Honestly and Robin's Nest. During the 1980s and 1990s, they continued to write for the occasional TV series and adapted Jilly Cooper's novel Riders for the television film Riders (1993).

Later work
Since the 1980s, Bingham has become a romantic novelist, writing novels including To Hear a Nightingale, The Business and In Sunshine or in Shadow. Most of her books are set in the 19th and 20th centuries. In 1996, she won the Romantic Novel of the Year Award from the Romantic Novelists' Association.

Bibliography

Non fiction
 Coronet Among the Weeds (1963)
 Coronet Among the Grass (1972)
 MI5 And Me (2018)
 Spies and Stars: MI5, Showbusiness and Me (2019)

Novels
 Lucinda (1966)
 The Business (1989)
 In Sunshine or in Shadow (1991)
 Stardust (1992)
 Nanny (1993)
 Change of Heart (1994)
 Grand Affair (1997)
 Love Song (1998)
 The Kissing Garden (1999)
 Country Wedding (1999)
 The Blue Note (2000)
 The Love Knot (2000)
 Summertime (2001)
 Distant Music (2002)
 The Magic Hour (2005)
 Friday's Girl (2005)
 Out of the Blue (2006)
 In Distant Fields (2006)
 The White Marriage (2007)
 Goodnight Sweetheart (2007)
 The Enchanted (2008)
 The Land of Summer (2008)
 The Daisy Club (2009)

Love Quartet
 Belgravia (1983)
 Country Life (1985)
 At Home (1986)
 By Invitation (1993)

Nightingale Saga
 To Hear a Nightingale (1988)
 The Nightingale Sings (1996)

Debutantes Saga
 Debutantes (1995)
 The Season (2001)

The Bexham Trilogy
 The Chestnut Tree (2002)
 The Wind Off the Sea (2003)
 The Moon at Midnight (2003)

Eden Saga
 Daughters of Eden (2004)
 The House of Flowers (2004)

Mums on the Run Series
 Mums on the Run (2010)
 A Dip Before Breakfast (2012)

With Terence Brady

Victoria Series
 Victoria (1972)
 Victoria and Company (1974)

Honestly Series
 No, Honestly (1974)
 Yes, Honestly (1977)

Upstairs, Downstairs Series
 Rose's Story (1972)

References and sources

External links

1942 births
Living people
Daughters of barons
English historical novelists
English romantic fiction writers
English television writers
British women screenwriters
English screenwriters
People from Haywards Heath
English women novelists
British women television writers
20th-century English novelists
21st-century British novelists
20th-century English women writers
21st-century English women writers
Women romantic fiction writers
Women historical novelists